St. Mary's Monastery is a monastery near Goranxi, Gjirokastër County, Albania. It is a Cultural Monument of Albania.

References

Cultural Monuments of Albania
Buildings and structures in Dropull